Steve Fitzhugh (born January 28, 1963, in Akron, Ohio) is a former professional American football player with the Denver Broncos. He began as a track and field all-star, becoming one of the top five sprinters in the country.

Fitzhugh attended Walsh Jesuit High School in Cuyahoga Falls, Ohio. There he was a highly touted football player and track star. He was highly recruited and selected Miami University on a full athletic scholarship to play football. There he was the captain of the football and track teams his senior year. Known as an "intimidating hitter", he was recruited by the National Football League. He signed with the Denver Broncos in 1986. He was sidelined by a shoulder injury after two years in the league.

He is now an author, humorist and motivational speaker spending much of his time as a professional communicator, with teenagers about drugs, alcohol, and right choices. He travels around the nation and abroad as a guest speaker for a variety of venues including schools, colleges professional athletic teams, corporations, and penal institutions.  Fitzhugh partnered with Ricky Bolden and Lon Solomon in co-founding The House, DC, three former crack houses transformed into an after school youth center which services the under served population of Anacostia, Southeast Washington, DC. Fitzhugh is also the national spokesperson for the Fellowship of Christian Athletes 'OneWay2Play-Drug Free' program. He has also been to Jacksonville Illinois and told his life story about drugs.

External links
Steve Fitzhugh on databasefootball.com

Nasty Video - Steve Fitzhugh - DC Tobacco Free Families
Steve Fitzhugh | Motivational Youth Speaker | Executive Speakers Bureau

1963 births
Living people
Players of American football from Akron, Ohio
American football safeties
Denver Broncos players
People from Cuyahoga Falls, Ohio